In phonology, a register, or pitch register, is a prosodic feature of syllables in certain languages in which tone, vowel phonation, glottalization or similar features depend upon one another.

It occurs in Burmese, Vietnamese, Wu Chinese and Zulu.

Burmese
In Burmese, differences in tone correlate with vowel phonation and so neither exists independently. There are three registers in Burmese, which have traditionally been considered three of the four "tones". (The fourth is not actually a register but is a closed syllable, and is similar to the so-called "entering tone" in Middle Chinese phonetics.) Jones (1986) views the differences as "resulting from the intersection of both pitch registers and voice registers.... Clearly Burmese is not tonal in the same sense as such other languages and therefore requires a different concept, namely that of pitch register."

Vietnamese
Similarly, several Vietnamese "tones" are largely distinguished by characteristics other than pitch. For example, in Northern Vietnamese, a ngã syllable is distinguished from the sắc primarily by the presence of a glottalization in the vowel. The nặng and huyền syllables are distinguished primarily by having a short creaky vowel, as opposed to a long breathy vowel.

Khmer
Khmer is sometimes considered to be a register language. It has also been called a "restructured register language" because both its pitch and phonation can be considered allophonic. If they are ignored, the phonemic distinctions that they carry remain as differences in diphthongs and vowel length.

Latvian
An example of a non-Asian language with register distinctions is Latvian, at least in the central dialects.  Long vowels in stressed syllables are often said to take one of three pitch accents that are conventionally called  "rising", falling", and "broken". However, the "broken tone" is distinguished not by pitch but by glottalization, and is similar to the ngã register of Northern Vietnamese.

References

Phonation